Johnny Frederiksen (born 31 July 1975 in Hvidovre) is a Danish curler from Copenhagen. He is the skip of the men's Danish national team.

Frederiksen skipped Denmark at three World Junior Curling Championships (1994, 1995, 1996), two European Curling Championships (2006, 2007) and five World Curling Championships (2001, 2004, 2005, 2007, 2008).  Frederiksen's best performance at the World Championships was a 2nd-place finish in 2016.

Frederiksen skipped the Danish team to a bronze medal at the 2007 European Curling Championships.

Teammates
2010 Vancouver Olympic Games

Ulrik Schmidt, Skip

Bo Jensen, Second

Lars Vilandt, Lead

Mikkel Poulsen, Alternate

External links
 
2010 Olympics profile

Danish male curlers
1975 births
Living people
Curlers at the 2010 Winter Olympics
Curlers at the 2014 Winter Olympics
Curlers at the 2018 Winter Olympics
Olympic curlers of Denmark
Sportspeople from Copenhagen
Continental Cup of Curling participants
People from Hvidovre Municipality
21st-century Danish people